Lorna María Cepeda Jiménez (born November 18, 1970), is a Colombian actress. Best known for her role in the famous Colombian Soap Opera Yo soy Betty, la fea (I'm Betty, the ugly one), also known as simply Betty la fea (Ugly Betty) from which more than a dozen versions have been made in other countries, including the American series Ugly Betty.

Biography
Lorna Cepeda was born in Cartagena, Colombia. Her entrance to show business started in Barranquilla at the age of 16. Lorna Cepeda started modeling in Diana de Biasse's academy. In 1993 she met Viena Ruiz, Irma Aristizabal and Tony Marquez, who were the owners of Stock Models Agency.

They predicted good prospects for her in Bogota. A year later Lorna Cepeda moved to that city and a new stage of her life started. Lorna Cepeda worked in Bogota until 1997. In this year she started studying to become an actress. Her first appearance was in the sitcom "Padres e Hijos" interpreting Magaly. She also participated in the comedy "Dulce Martirio" where she assumed the principal role. In the series "El Dia de Hoy" she played Catalina. In 1998, Lorna Cepeda joined the cast of "Castillo de Naipes". In "El amor es mas fuerte" she played Natalia and Juliana in "Amor en forma". "Yo soy Betty la fea" increased her popularity in 1999 and really brought her fame.

She is the sister of the also actress Angie Cepeda.

Career

Soap operas 
 Dulce martirio ...  Martirio
 El día es hoy ...   Catalina
 El amor es más fuerte ... Natalia
 Amor en forma ... Juliana
 Yo soy Betty, la fea ... Patricia Fernández
 Provócame  ... Margarita
 Mi pequeña mamá  ...  Cassandra
 Bésame tonto
 Doctor amor
 La diva   ... Victoria
 Chepe Fortuna... La celosa

Series
 Padres e hijos  ...  Magali
 Casados con hijos ... Lola
 Guayoyo express
 Amor, Mentiras y Video ... Angela
 Hasta que la Plata nos Separe ... Rosaura Echeverri

Film
 En alquiler

Theater
 Estado civil infiel

Television ads
 Sprite
 Chiclets Adams
 Limonada Postobon
 Oster (2001–2002)
 Alpina
 Cel Caribe, Barranquilla (2001–2002)

External links

Small biography (in Spanish)

1970 births
Living people
Colombian actresses
Colombian people of Basque descent
Colombian people of Spanish descent
People from Cartagena, Colombia